The European Journal of Post-Classical Archaeologies is a peer-reviewed academic journal covering the archaeology of the post-classical era that was established in 2011. It is published by the Società Archeologica and the editors-in-chief are Gian Pietro Brogiolo and Alexandra Chavarría Arnau ( University of Padua). The journal offers an annual award for the best single-authored paper submitted by a young researcher (under 35 years of age).

Abstracting and indexing
The journal is abstracted and indexed in Scopus.

References

External links

Archaeology journals
Publications established in 2011
Continuous journals
Academic journals published by learned and professional societies
Multilingual journals